Nikki Bacólod (born Monique Echieverri Bacólod on August 18, 1989), is a Filipina singer, television host, swimmer and actress. She is best known for placing as first runner up in the 2005 season of ABS-CBN's Search for the Star in a Million. As a result of her placing, she won a recording contract under VIVA Records, and thereafter released two albums, In Full Bloom and Not That Kind of Girl.

Filmography

Television

Films
2012: Of All the Things as Princess Pamintuan
2010: Babe, I Love You as KengKeng
2009: You Changed My Life as Beng
2008: Baler as Lumeng
2007: Ang Cute Ng Ina Mo as Lisa

Discography

Solo albums

Awards and recognition
 2008 Metro Manila Film Festival nominated for "Best Supporting Actress" from the movie "Baler".

See also
 Search for the Star in a Million

References

External links
 Nikki's Official Website
 

Star Magic
De La Salle University alumni
1989 births
Living people
21st-century Filipino actresses
Participants in Philippine reality television series
People from Iligan
Viva Records (Philippines) artists
21st-century Filipino women singers